Rampart Canyon, Rampart Gorge, Lower Ramparts, and The Ramparts all are names for a high-banked canyon of the Yukon River located downstream of Rampart, Alaska and upstream of Tanana, Alaska.

References
 

Landforms of Yukon–Koyukuk Census Area, Alaska
Yukon River